Hey Mama! is the debut extended play by Exo-CBX, the first official sub-unit of the South Korean-Chinese boy group Exo. It was released on October 31, 2016, by SM Entertainment under distribution by KT Music. The EP features five tracks in total with a variety of genres.

Background and release 
On October 24, 2016, SM Entertainment announced that Chen, Baekhyun and Xiumin would debut as Exo's first official sub-unit Exo-CBX with an extended play titled Hey Mama!. On October 25, a teaser for the music video of the title track "Hey Mama!" was revealed. On October 27, a highlight medley, featuring previews of the album's tracks, premiered on Apple Music's Beats 1. The album and the title track's music video were released on October 31.
On November 7, 2016, SM Entertainment released the music video for the second single "The One" in their official YouTube account.

Promotion 
A promotional event for Hey Mama! was held at 8PM (KST) on October 31 on a special stage located at the east side of Samseong-dong COEX in Seoul. The event was live streamed on Exo's V App channel. Exo-CBX made their debut performance on M Countdown on November 3, and subsequently performed the song on Music Bank and Show! Music Core.

On November 5, 2016, Exo-CBX performed "Hey Mama!" at You Hee-yeol's Sketchbook. On November 18, 2016, the group performed "Hey Mama!", "The One", and "Cherish" at the OGN World Championship N-Pop Showcase. On February 18, 2017, Exo-CBX performed "Hey Mama!", and "The One" at the K-Drama Fest in Pyeongchang. The group performed the Japanese version of "Hey Mama!" as well as "The One" and "Cherish" at the 2017 Girls Awards on May 3, 2017. Exo-CBX performed "Hey Mama!" on Music Bank on May 19, 2017, in Jeonju in honor of FIFA U-20 World Cup. On August 26, 2017, Exo-CBX performed the Japanese version of "Hey Mama!", "Cherish", on a-nation concert in Japan.

Critical reception
Hey Mama! debuted atop the Billboard World Albums Chart and the South Korean Gaon weekly album chart.

Commercial performance
The album sold 275,000 copies in 2016. Hey Mama! became the highest selling album by a sub-unit in 2016 in Gaon Chart with 275,191 copies and in Hanteo with 202,281 copies sold.

Track listing

Charts

Weekly charts

Monthly charts

Year-end charts

Sales

Accolades

Music program awards

Release history

References

External links

2016 debut EPs
SM Entertainment EPs
Korean-language EPs
Dance-pop EPs
Electronic EPs
Genie Music EPs
Exo-CBX EPs